Mey is a surname (sometimes an alternative transliteration of Mei).

People with the name include:

Alexandra Mey, (Claudia Alexandra Morales Mejías, born 1992), Venezuelan actress and producer
Cornelius Jacobsen May or Mey, early 17th century Dutch explorer
François Carlo Mey (born 2003), Italian rugby player
Jacob L. Mey (1926–2023), Dutch-born Danish professor of linguistics
Karin Melis Mey (born 1983), Turkish long jumper
Karl Mey (1879–1945), German industrial physicist
Kerstin Mey (born 1963), German academic and president of Irish university
Lev Mei or Mey (1822–1862), Russian dramatist and poet
Marie-Anett Mey (born 1971), French entertainer
Mey Norn (fl. from 2003), Cambodian politician
Ousmane Mey (fl. from 1972), Cameroonian politician
Piet Mey (born 1948), South African politician
Reinhard Mey (born 1942), German singer-songwriter
Ros Mey (1925–2010), Cambodian-born American Buddhist monk 
Théo Mey (1912–1964), Luxembourg photographer
Uwe-Jens Mey (born 1963), German speed skater
Varvara P. Mey (1912–1995), Russian prima ballerina

See also
 Mei (surname)
 May (surname)